Arberella is a genus of Neotropical bamboo in the grass family.

Species
 Arberella bahiensis - Venezuela (Amazonas), Brazil (Bahia)
 Arberella costaricensis - Costa Rica
 Arberella dressleri - Panama
 Arberella flaccida - Colombia, French Guiana, Suriname, Brazil (Amazonas, Rondônia, Mato Grosso)
 Arberella grayumii - Costa Rica
 Arberella lancifolia - Panama
 Arberella venezuelae - Venezuela (Amazonas)

See also
List of Poaceae genera

References

External links
Grassbase - The World Online Grass Flora

Bambusoideae
Grasses of North America
Grasses of South America
Flora of Central America
Grasses of Argentina
Grasses of Brazil
Bambusoideae genera